{{DISPLAYTITLE:C19H23ClN2}}
The molecular formula C19H23ClN2 (molar mass: 314.85 g/mol, exact mass: 314.1550 u) may refer to:

 Clomipramine
 Homochlorcyclizine

Molecular formulas